The Bangladesh cricket team toured Scotland, playing one One Day International on 19 July 2010. Bangladesh played an additional ODI against the Netherlands on 20 July, also in Scotland.

ODI Series - Bangladesh v Scotland

1st ODI

ODI Series - Bangladesh v Netherlands

1st ODI

2010 in Scottish cricket
2010
International cricket competitions in 2010